Upper Sioux Agency State Park is a Minnesota state park on the Minnesota River, south of Granite Falls. It preserves the site of the historic Upper Sioux Agency (or Yellow Medicine Agency), which was destroyed in the Dakota War of 1862.  The agency site was listed on the National Register of Historic Places in 1970 for having state-level significance under the themes of archaeology, architecture, education, and social history. Chief Walking Iron Mazomani, a leader of the Wahpetonwan (Dwellers in the Leaves) Dakota tribes who was killed during the 1862 Dakota War's Battle of Wood Lake, is buried at this location.

See also
 Upper Sioux Indian Reservation

References

External links

Upper Sioux Agency State Park

1963 establishments in Minnesota
Archaeological sites on the National Register of Historic Places in Minnesota
Dakota War of 1862
Government buildings on the National Register of Historic Places in Minnesota
Minnesota River
Protected areas established in 1963
Protected areas of Yellow Medicine County, Minnesota
State parks of Minnesota
Historic districts on the National Register of Historic Places in Minnesota
National Register of Historic Places in Yellow Medicine County, Minnesota